The Bulgarelli Number 8 Award is an annual association football award given by the Associazione Bulgarelli and Italian Footballers' Association, with the support of FIFPro, to the best midfielder of the previous calendar year.

History and regulations
The award originated from an idea by Italian journalist Luigi Colombo. The award is given by a jury. In the first edition, the jury was chaired by Fabio Capello and composed of former football players and managers Sandro Mazzola, Gianni Rivera, Sergio Campana, Damiano Tommasi, Luis Suárez, Cesare Prandelli, Giovanni Trapattoni, José Altafini, Giovanni Lodetti, Francesco Janich, Romano Fogli, Ezio Pascutti, Marino Perani, Leonardo Grosso as well as Colombo himself.

The award was temporarily interrupted after the 2013 edition due to a lack of financial sponsors. The award was restored in 2016.

Winners

References

Association football trophies and awards
Italian football trophies and awards
Awards established in 2011